Adam House is a grade II* listed house at 13 The Green, Calne, Wiltshire, England. The house dates from the seventeenth century and was refronted around 1740. It also includes nineteenth and twentieth century interior and rear additions. It was said by Lord Shelbourne to be named after the architect Robert Adam, who lived there while working on Bowood House.

References 

Grade II* listed buildings in Wiltshire
Calne
Grade II* listed houses
Houses completed in the 17th century
Houses in Wiltshire